Ivan Rendić (27 August 1849 in Imotski – 29 June 1932 in Split) was a Croatian sculptor.

Biography 
He began sculpting early on in life, thanks to the stoneworking tradition of the island of Brač, where he was raised. He finished arts school in Venice in 1871 and afterwards became a part of the Fiorentine sculpting atelier. Later he mostly lived and worked in Trieste where he made the bulk of his works. In Croatia, most of his works were displayed in Zagreb and Split.

He was the first famous and educated Croatian sculptor of Modern age. He worked in the Realist style with elements of naturalism, especially in finer details.

Rendić made around 200 statues. His most famous works were public monuments raised in honour of famous Croats which remain over all parts of Croatia, for example, his statues of Andrija Medulić, Julije Klović, Krsto I Frankopan, Ivan Gundulić, Nikola Jurišić and August Šenoa at Zrinjevac park in Zagreb, as well as Petar Preradović and Andrija Kačić Miošić also in Zagreb, Ljudevit Gaj in Krapina, and busts of Eugen Kumičić, emperor Franz Joseph I and others in Supetar.

From 1921 he lived in Supetar, where he attempted in vain to form a school of arts. He finished his life in poverty.

Because of its support to the Illyrian movement and unification of Dalmatia with the rest of Croatia, he was the target of attacks of Italianists and Italian expansionists, especially during his work in Trieste.

Gallery

See also
 List of Croatian artists
 Realism (arts)

External links
Ivan Rendić Gallery in Supetar
Short biography
Busts of the artist in Supetar Library
70th anniversary of Rendić's death

19th-century Croatian sculptors
20th-century Croatian sculptors
1849 births
1932 deaths
People from Imotski
Realist artists
People from the Kingdom of Croatia-Slavonia